Jerry Spring is a Franco-Belgian Western comics series created by the Belgian comics creator Jijé. Originally published in Spirou magazine, the series made its debut on March 4, 1954.

Bibliography

Notes

Sources

 Jerry Spring publications in Spirou BDoubliées 

Dupuis titles
Belgian comic strips
Spring, Jerry
Spring, Jerry
Spring, Jerry
1954 comics debuts
Spring, Jerry
1977 comics endings
1990 comics debuts
1990 comics endings
Spring, Jerry
Western (genre) comics
Drama comics